Rajasthan has over 50 private, state and central government Universities which makes it one of the leading states in Indian higher education system. The National Assessment and Accreditation Council is leading system of quality system for higher educational institutions established by the Ministry of Human Resource Development under University Grants Commission (India) . The NAAC accreditation is the official measure of Government of India for quality in education, course delivery, research in all fields including engineering, management, sciences, social sciences, pharmacy, hotel management. Through a rigorous process of inspections and peer review, the council gives scores out of 4 and calculates grades according to the score. Highest scoring university in Rajasthan by NAAC score is Banasthali Vidyapith. Banasthali Vidyapith was awarded A++ grade which is highest in Rajasthan. The list includes all universities in Rajasthan which have gone through the NAAC accreditation process. All of these universities have varying undergraduate programs like B.Tech, BBA, BCA,  B.Pharmacy as well as postgraduate programs like M.Tech, MBA, MCA etc.

List of Ranking of Universities in Rajasthan by NAAC Score

The list is produced by National Assessment and Accreditation Council and updated over the years. Recently, Bhagwant University was blacklisted for five years until a re-accreditation procedure takes place.

See also
 List of universities in Rajasthan
 List of universities in India
 List of private universities in India
 List of central universities in India
 List of state universities in India
 List of deemed universities in India
 List of autonomous higher education institutes in India
 List of Institutes of National Importance

References 

private universities